James Lafayette Dickey (February 2, 1923   January 19, 1997) was an American poet and novelist. He was appointed the eighteenth United States Poet Laureate in 1966. He also received the Order of the South award.

Dickey is best known for his novel Deliverance (1970), which was adapted into the acclaimed 1972 film of the same name.

Early years
Dickey was born to lawyer Eugene Dickey and Maibelle Swift in Atlanta, Georgia, where he attended North Fulton High School in Atlanta's Buckhead neighborhood. After graduation from North Fulton High in 1941, Dickey completed a postgraduate year at Darlington School in Rome, Georgia. Dickey asked to be dismissed from the Darlington rolls in a 1981 letter to the principal, deeming the school the most "disgusting combination of cant, hypocrisy, cruelty, class privilege and inanity I have ever since encountered at any human institution." In 1942, he enrolled at Clemson Agricultural College of South Carolina and played on the football team as a tailback. After one semester, he left school to enlist in the military. During World War II, Dickey served with the U.S. Army Air Forces, where he flew thirty-eight missions in the PacificTheater as a P-61 Black Widow radar operator with the 418th Night Fighter Squadron, an experience that influenced his work, and for which he was awarded five Bronze Stars.. He later served in the U.S. Air Force during the Korean War. Between the wars, he attended Vanderbilt University, graduating magnacumlaude with a degree in English and philosophy (as well as minoring in astronomy) in 1949. He also received an M.A. in English from Vanderbilt in 1950.

Career
Dickey taught as an instructor of English at Rice University (then Rice Institute) in Houston, Texas in 1950 and following his second Air Force stint, from 1952 to 1954, Dickey returned to academic teaching. Dickey then quit his teaching job at the University of Florida in the spring of 1956 after a group of the American Pen's Women's Society protested his reading of the poem called The Father's Body; he quit rather than apologize. This incident some critics believe he manipulated to his advantage, he became a successful copy writer for advertising agencies selling Coca-Cola and Lay's potato chips while in his free time writing some of his best poetry. He once said he embarked on his advertising career in order to "make some bucks." Dickey also said "I was selling my soul to the devil all day... and trying to buy it back at night." He was ultimately fired for shirking his work responsibilities.

His first book, Into the Stone and Other Poems, was published in 1960. Drowning with Others was published in 1962, which led to a Guggenheim Fellowship (Norton Anthology, The Literature of the American South). Buckdancer's Choice (1965) earned him a National Book Award for Poetry.
Among his better-known poems are "The Performance", "Cherrylog Road", "The Firebombing", "May Day Sermon", "Falling", and "For The Last Wolverine".

He published his first volume of collected poems, Poems 1957-1967 in 1967 after being named a poetry consultant for the Library of Congress. This publishing may represent Dickey's best work. After serving as a visiting lecturer at several institutions from 1963 to 1968 (including Reed College, California State University, Northridge, the University of Wisconsin–Madison, the University of Wisconsin–Milwaukee, Washington University in St. Louis and the Georgia Institute of Technology), Dickey returned to academia in earnest in 1969 as a professor of English and writer-in-residence at the University of South Carolina, a position he held for the remainder of his life. It was there that he was also inducted into Omicron Delta Kappa, the National Leadership Honor Society, in 1970.

Dickey wrote the poem The Moon Ground for Life magazine in celebration of the Apollo 11 moon landing.  His reading of it was broadcast on ABC television on July 20, 1969.

His popularity exploded after the film version of his novel Deliverance was released in 1972. Dickey wrote the screenplay and had a cameo in the film as a sheriff.

On January 20, 1977, Dickey was invited to read his poem The Strength of Fields at the inauguration of Jimmy Carter.

Personal life
In November 1948 he married Maxine Syerson, and three years later they had their first son, Christopher; a second son, Kevin, was born in 1958.

Christopher Dickey was a novelist and journalist, providing coverage from the Middle East for Newsweek. In 1998, Christopher wrote a book about his father and Christopher's own sometimes troubled relationship with him, titled Summer of Deliverance. Christopher died in July 2020.

Kevin Dickey is an interventional radiologist and lives in Winston-Salem, NC.

Two months after Maxine died in 1976, Dickey married one of his students, Deborah Dodson. Their daughter, Bronwen, was born in 1981. Bronwen is an author, journalist, and lecturer. Her first book, Pit Bull: The Battle over an American Icon,  was published in 2016.

Death
Dickey died on January 19, 1997, aged 73, six days after his last class at the University of South Carolina, where from 1968 he taught as poet-in-residence. 
Dickey spent his last years in and out of hospitals, afflicted with severe alcoholism, jaundice and later pulmonary fibrosis.

Works

Publications

Novels

Poetry 

 Into the Stone and Other Poems (in Poets of Today VII) (1960)
 Drowning with Others (1962)
 Two Poems of the Air (1964)
 Helmets (1964)
 Buckdancer's Choice: Poems (1965) —winner of the National Book Award
 Poems 1957-67 (1967)
 The Achievement of James Dickey: A Comprehensive Selection of His Poems (1968)
 The Eye-Beaters, Blood, Victory, Madness, Buckhead and Mercy (1970)
 Exchanges (1971)
 The Zodiac (1976)
 The Owl King (1977)
 Veteran Birth: The Gadfly Poems 1947-49 (1978)
 Tucky the Hunter (1978)
 Head-Deep in Strange Sounds: Free-Flight Improvisations from the unEnglish (1979)
 The Strength of Fields (1979)
 Falling, May Day Sermon, and Other Poems (1981)
 The Early Motion (1981)
 Puella (1982)
 Värmland (1982)
 False Youth: Four Seasons (1983)
 For a Time and Place (1983)
 Intervisions (1983)
 The Central Motion: Poems 1968-79 (1983)
 Bronwen, The Traw, and the Shape-Shifter: A Poem in Four Parts (1986)
 Summons (1988)
 The Eagle's Mile (1990)

 The Selected Poems (1998)
 The Complete Poems of James Dickey (2013)
 Death, and the Day's Light (2015)

Illustrated prose

Non-fiction

Filmography

 Deliverance (novel / screenplay) (1972) - Sheriff Bullard (cameo film role)
 The Call of the Wild (screenplay) (1976)

References

External links

 The James Dickey Page
 James Dickey papers at the University of South Carolina Department of Rare Books and Special Collections
 James Dickey Newsletter & Society
 CNN Audio Clips with James Dickey
 1977 audio interview of James Dickey by Stephen Banker 
 James Dickey at Academy of American Poets — with brief biography and selected list of works
 James Dickey Papers at Washington University in St. Louis
 Joyce Morrow Pair collection of James Dickey at the University of South Carolina Department of Rare Books and Special Collections
 Matthew J. Bruccoli collection of James Dickey at the University of South Carolina Department of Rare Books and Special Collections
 Donald J. and Ellen Greiner collection of James Dickey at the University of South Carolina Department of Rare Books and Special Collections
 James Dickey  in New Georgia Encyclopedia
 James Dickey at Modern American Poetry
 
 James Dickey Revisited - online "themed issue" of the South Carolina Review that collects all pieces by and about James Dickey that have been published in that literary journal since 2001, in addition to content related to a James Dickey Festival that was hosted at Clemson University.
 Bronwen Dickey on her father's legacy
 Clark Powell Harbinger, "James Dickey: A Personal Memory" 
 
James Dickey Papers at Stuart A. Rose Manuscript, Archives, and Rare Book Library

1923 births
1997 deaths
20th-century American novelists
20th-century American poets
American male novelists
American male poets
American Poets Laureate
United States Army Air Forces personnel of World War II
United States Air Force personnel of the Korean War
Clemson University alumni
Poets from Georgia (U.S. state)
Writers from Atlanta
Writers from Columbia, South Carolina
National Book Award winners
Rice University faculty
Poets from South Carolina
University of Florida faculty
University of South Carolina faculty
Vanderbilt University alumni
Writers of American Southern literature
20th-century American male writers
Novelists from Texas
Novelists from Florida
Novelists from Georgia (U.S. state)
Novelists from South Carolina
Darlington School alumni
Military personnel from Georgia (U.S. state)
United States Army Air Forces soldiers
Members of the American Academy of Arts and Letters
Reed College faculty
California State University, Northridge faculty
University of Wisconsin–Madison faculty
University of Wisconsin–Milwaukee faculty
Washington University in St. Louis faculty
Georgia Tech faculty